Ronald Wilfried Kolf (born June 5, 1939) is a former Surinamese football manager and player who last served as the technical director of the Suriname national team and a board member of Surinamese football club S.V. Leo Victor.

As a player, he played in the Surinamese Hoofdklasse for S.V. Robinhood and for S.V. Transvaal, having taken a brief player-coaching role at Concordia in Moengo, he would return to Paramaribo to finish his playing career at Transvaal. He is one of the most successful managers in Suriname, having led Transvaal and Robinhood to a total 15 national titles.

Career

Early career
Kolf grew up playing for various youth teams on the Mr. Bronsplein such as Rio, De Trappers and Millionaros, before getting picked up by S.V. Robinhood where he progressed through the youth ranks, winning two youth national championships. He was scouted by Andre de Vries. On the Bronsplein is where grew up playing with players such as Wim Petrici, Jan Helstone van Eyck, Charlo Stynberg, and Kenny Headley. He was given his first pair of football boots by Etire Strok, whom he admired, but his greatest idol growing up was Humphrey Mijnals.

SV Robinhood
In 1958, Kolf made his Hoofdklasse debut in the first team of Robinhood. He would play with the team for three seasons winning the national title twice in 1959 and 1961. In 1962 Kolf parted ways with Robinhood over differences with the technical team, and signed with crosstown rivals S.V. Transvaal instead.

SV Transvaal
Kolf joined S.V. Transvaal in 1962 where he played for three seasons winning the national title in 1962 and 1965.

Concordia
In 1965, Kolf relocated to Moengo, taking a teaching position at a school, where he joined local club Concordia, taking his first managerial role while also playing as a player. After two seasons, Kolf returned to Paramaribo joining S.V. Transvaal as a player-youth coach.

Return to Transvaal
Kolf returned to S.V. Transvaal where he was playing for the first team, while coaching the youth teams. After one season which saw Kolf winning the national championship with the first team, and two national championships with the youth teams, Kolf took over as manager of the club the following season, retiring as a player.

Managerial career
Kolf took on his first job as a football manager when he relocated to Moengo for a teaching position at a local school. At the time, Kolf had joined the club Concordia taking on a player-manager function for two seasons before returning to Paramaribo. Upon his return, Kolf took on a coaching position at his former club S.V. Transvaal, coaching the youth teams, while actively playing in the first team. That season he was able to secure two National championships with the youth teams, while winning the National title with the first team. The following season, saw Kolf taking on the manager position of S.V. Transvaal.

As manager of Transvaal, Kolf led the team to consecutive national titles in 1967 and 1968, before taking over the manager position of S.V. Robinhood. Kolf successfully led the club to 13 national titles, making it to the finals of the CONCACAF Champions' Cup on five occasions, namely in 1972, 1976, 1977, 1982 and 1983.

In 1976, Kolf was the assistant to Walther Braithwaite for Suriname's 1978 FIFA World Cup qualifying campaign. In 2000 Kolf took over as the manager of the national team after 31 years at the helm of Robinhood, for the country's 2002 FIFA World Cup qualifying campaign where they were eliminated by Cuba. He also helped Suriname the final stages of the 2001 Caribbean Cup.

In 2003, Kolf took over as manager of S.V. Leo Victor,  winning the Surinamese Cup and the Suriname President's Cup in his first year with the club. In 2008, he became the technical director for the club. In 2013 Kolf was made the technical director of the Suriname national football team.

Career statistics

Manager

Suriname matches

Honours

Player
S.V. Robinhood
 Hoofdklasse (2): 1959, 1961

S.V. Transvaal
 Hoofdklasse (2): 1962, 1965

Manager
S.V. Transvaal
 Hoofdklasse (2): 1967, 1968

S.V. Robinhood
 Hoofdklasse (13): 1971, 1975, 1976, 1979, 1980, 1981, 1983, 1984, 1985, 1986, 1987, 1988, 1989
 CONCACAF Champions' Cup Runner-up (5): 1972, 1976, 1977, 1982, 1983

S.V. Leo Victor
 Beker van Suriname (1): 2003
 Suriname President's Cup (1): 2003

Individual
 Suriprofs oeuvreprijs: 2013

References 

Living people
1939 births
Sportspeople from Paramaribo
Surinamese footballers
Surinamese football managers
S.V. Robinhood managers
S.V. Leo Victor managers
Suriname national football team managers
S.V. Robinhood players
S.V. Transvaal players
SVB Eerste Divisie players
SVB Eerste Divisie managers
20th-century Surinamese businesspeople
Association football forwards